Nizam al-Din, spelled variously Nizamuddin or Nizamüddin or etc. may refer to:

People
Niżām ad-Dīn Abū Muḥammad Ilyās ibn-Yūsuf ibn-Zakī ibn-Mu‘ayyad, or Nizami Ganjavi (1141–1209), Persian epic poet
Nizamuddin Auliya (1238–1325), Sufi saint of the Chishti Order
Nizamüddin Ahmed Pasha (fl. 1331–1348), Ottoman grand vizier
Koca Mehmed Nizamüddin Pasha (died 1439), Ottoman grand vizier
Nizam al-Din Yahya (c. 1417–1480), Mihrabanid malik of Sistan
Jam Nizamuddin II (died 1509), sultan of the Samma Dynasty
Mohammed Nizamuddin (d. 2016), Indian trade unionist and politician
Nizamuddin Ahmad (1551–1621), Muslim historian of India
Khwaja Nizam ad Din, Kashmiri Sufi
G. Nizamuddin (born 1954), Indian politician
 Nizamuddin Shamzai (1952-2004) (Pakistani Islamic scholar)

Places in India
Nizamuddin West, Delhi
Nizamuddin East, Delhi
Hazrat Nizamuddin railway station, Delhi
Nizamuddin Dargah, mausoleum in Delhi

See also 
Nizamettin (disambiguation)
Nizami (disambiguation)
Nizam (disambiguation)

Arabic masculine given names